Astley  is a civil parish in Shropshire, England.  It contains eight listed buildings that are recorded in the National Heritage List for England.  Of these, two are listed at Grade II*, the middle grade of the three grades, and the others are at Grade II, the lowest grade.  The parish contains the village of Astley and the surrounding countryside.  The listed buildings in the village are a church, a small country house and structures in its garden, two farmhouses and a private house.  The only listed building outside the village is a milepost.


Key

Buildings

References

Citations

Sources

Lists of buildings and structures in Shropshire